The Hurt Process was a British-based hardcore/metalcore band from Tunbridge Wells, England. Their second album, A Heartbeat Behind, was released on 31 May 2005. The band split up in 2005. They reunited in August 2019.

Biography
In 2002, The Hurt Process released the Another Day EP on Loudspeaker, to rave reviews from Big Cheese, Kerrang!, Metal Hammer, and Rocksound who said: "This EP rocks harder than a Whitesnake roadie at a Venom concert!, You need The Hurt Process. Amazing. Destined to be on the UKs hottest new bands".

The Hurt Process built a substantial fan base with touring and concerts, sharing the stage with Taking Back Sunday, Atreyu and Silverstein. In 2003, Inherited Industries released the Last Goodbye EP.

The band's debut album, Drive By Monologue, was also received with critical praise. Mike Davies of BBC Radio said, "Who says that Americans do it better? The Hurt Process will be exploding out of the underground with Drive By Monologue. This is how melodic hardcore should be done". Victory Records released the album in North America, prompting praise from Revolver, who said, "Drive By Monologue seamlessly shifts gears from grinding hardcore to introspective emo without ever losing its keen sense of direction. Stick along for the ride".

The band played several weeks on the Warped Tour 2004, expanding their fan base stateside. The band split up in 2006.

Press
"This band rocks harder than a Whitesnake roadie at a venom concert" - Big Cheese

"The aural equivalent of being punched in the face only for your attacker to offer to kiss the bruising better" - Kerrang!

"This was another winning set from the Hurt Process lads, who it must be said are going from strength to strength. They were the act of the night and they provoked the best, if somewhat chaotic, reaction from the exuberant crowd." - BBC review of a live show.

Band members
Daniel Lawrence: Vocals
Tom Valentine-Diamond: Guitar, Vocals
Darren Toms: Drums
Duncan McGilvary: Bass

Previous members
Ivan Ferreira: Vocals
Brendan McNally: Guitar
Adam Yeoman: Drums
Jordan Schulze: Guitar
Alun Burnet-Smith: Guitar
Mark Andrews: Vocals

Discography

Albums
Drive By Monologue (2003)
A Heartbeat Behind (2005)

Demos and EPs
Another Day (2002 EP)
Last Goodbye (2003 EP)

References

English metalcore musical groups
People from Royal Tunbridge Wells
Musical groups from Kent
British post-hardcore musical groups